Miroslav Hozda (born 6 May 1986 in Jilemnice) is a Czech football defender who currently plays for SC Amaliendorf-Aafland.

References

External links

FK Jablonec profile
Eurofotbal profile

1986 births
Living people
Czech footballers
Czech expatriate footballers
Association football defenders
FK Jablonec players
FK Dukla Prague players
Czech First League players
Czech National Football League players
FC DAC 1904 Dunajská Streda players
2. Liga (Slovakia) players
Expatriate footballers in Slovakia
Czech expatriate sportspeople in Slovakia
Expatriate footballers in Austria
Czech expatriate sportspeople in Austria
People from Jilemnice
Sportspeople from the Liberec Region